Aleksandr Sergeyevich Spivak (born 6 January 1975) is a retired Ukrainian football midfielder who last played for Zenit Saint Petersburg and had been with the organization since 2000. Before coming to Zenit, Spivak has been with multiple clubs including Silur Khartsyzsk, Stal Mielec, SC Odesa, Shakhtar Donetsk, Stal Alchevsk, Metallurg, Zirka Kirovohrad, Chornomorets Odesa. A former Ukrainian international, Spivak also has Russian citizenship. He was an attacking midfielder.

External links
Club profile

1975 births
Living people
Ukrainian footballers
Ukraine international footballers
Ukrainian expatriate footballers
Expatriate footballers in Poland
Expatriate footballers in Russia
FC Zirka Kropyvnytskyi players
FC Stal Alchevsk players
FC Zenit Saint Petersburg players
FC Chornomorets Odesa players
FC Metalurh Zaporizhzhia players
FC Shakhtar Donetsk players
Stal Mielec players
Ukrainian Premier League players
Ukrainian First League players
Ukrainian Second League players
Russian Premier League players
Association football midfielders
Ukrainian expatriate sportspeople in Poland
Ukrainian expatriate sportspeople in Russia
Sportspeople from Mariupol